The 2016–17 season was Udinese Calcio's 37th season in Serie A and their 22nd consecutive season in the top-flight. The club competed in Serie A, finishing 13th, and in the Coppa Italia, where they were eliminated in the third round by Serie B side Spezia Calcio.

Players

Squad information

Transfers

In

Loans in

Out

Loans out

Pre-season and friendlies

Competitions

Overall

Last updated: 28 May 2017

Serie A

League table

Results summary

Results by round

Matches

Coppa Italia

Statistics

Appearances and goals

|-
! colspan=14 style=background:#dcdcdc; text-align:center| Goalkeepers

|-
! colspan=14 style=background:#dcdcdc; text-align:center| Defenders

|-
! colspan=14 style=background:#dcdcdc; text-align:center| Midfielders

|-
! colspan=14 style=background:#dcdcdc; text-align:center| Forwards

|-
! colspan=14 style=background:#dcdcdc; text-align:center| Players transferred out during the season

Goalscorers

Last updated: 28 May 2017

Clean sheets

Last updated: 28 May 2017

Disciplinary record

Last updated: 28 May 2017

References

Udinese Calcio seasons
Udinese